Struve is the lava-flooded remains of a lunar impact crater. It is located near the western extreme of the Oceanus Procellarum, close to the western lunar limb. As a consequence, even though it is roughly circular in outline, it appears oval due to foreshortening.

The northern rim of this crater intersects the smaller lava-flooded crater Russell to the north, and there is now a wide gap between the two formations. Attached to the southeast rim is the remains of another lava-flooded formation, Eddington. Farther to the southwest is Balboa, near the lunar limb.

The rim of Struve is heavily worn and irregular, with several gaps connecting to the surrounding mare. It resembles little more than a circular mountain range, climbing to a maximum height of 1.7 km. There are several small impact craters within the wall, most notably in the southeast part of the crater. The crater Struve G overlaps the inner part of the western rim, and just to the north of this crater is a gap in the wall that connects to the Oceanus Procellarum between the rims of Russell and Eddington.

On older maps this formation was named Otto Struve. It now honors three members of the same family, all astronomers.

Satellite craters
By convention these features are identified on lunar maps by placing the letter on the side of the crater midpoint that is closest to Struve.

References

 
 
 
 
 
 
 
 
 
 
 
 

Impact craters on the Moon
Struve family